The Yates-Flora House is a historic mansion in Macon, Mississippi, U.S.. It was built in 1868 for John Lee Williams. It was designed in the Greek Revival architectural style. In 1906, it was purchased by E. V. Yates, a large landowner. It remained in the Yates family until 1961. It has been listed on the National Register of Historic Places since December 2, 1982.

References

Houses on the National Register of Historic Places in Mississippi
Greek Revival houses in Mississippi
Houses completed in 1868
National Register of Historic Places in Noxubee County, Mississippi